Water Oak Plantation was a small cotton plantation of  located in northern Leon County, Florida, United States established by Richard Bradford.

Location 
Water Oak was located in the general area of Bradfordville.
Adjacent plantations:

Pine Hill Plantation to the east
Walnut Hill Plantation, Water Oak Plantation being very close to Walnut Hill

Plantation specifics 
The Leon County Florida 1860 Agricultural Census shows that Water Oak Plantation had the following:
 Improved Land: 
 Unimproved Land: 
 Cash value of plantation: $18,400
 Cash value of farm implements/machinery: $1500
 Cash value of farm animals: $3,500
 Number of slaves: 65
Bushels of corn: 2500
Bales of cotton: 130

The founder 
Richard Henry Bradford born November 15, 1800 in Enfield, North Carolina.

The Bradford brothers took turns hosting July 4 celebrations with massive barbecues for their slaves. When it was Richard's turn to host the celebration he included fishing parties on Lake Iamonia. No whites were allowed to attend these events.

During the Civil War, Richard was captain of a company of the 1st Florida Regiment. He left with his regiment for Pensacola, Florida in the fall of 1861. On the night of October 9, 1861, while leading an attack column in the assault on Federal positions during the Battle of Santa Rosa Island, on Santa Rosa Island, Florida, he was shot and killed by a sentinel of the 6th New York Volunteer Infantry. His body was returned for a hero’s funeral, and was buried in the cemetery at Pine Hill Plantation. He could well have been the first Floridian killed in Confederate action.

The 1900s

When Clement A. Griscom died on October 19, 1916, Horseshoe Plantation was divided up and part sold. Lloyd C. Griscom received  on the west side naming it Luna Plantation while Frances C. Griscom, a sportswoman, received  of the old plantation to the east and named it Water Oak Plantation. Frances Griscom was the 1900 United States Women's Amateur Golf Championship.

In 1951 Griscom sold a large part of Water Oak to J.C. (Bull) Headley, a recent transplant from Kentucky. Griscom retained Water Oak with a few hundred acres of land. Headley turned his  property in to Bull Run Plantation, a luxurious farm which grew in agricultural output. Headley ran several hundred head of cattle and continued with operations as a hunting plantation. Headley built a $150,000 Georgian style brick home overlooking Lake Iamonia. Other hunters, golfers, and fishing enthusiasts joined in and the property became Kinhega Lodge.

References 

Paisley, Clifton; From Cotton To Quail, University of Florida Press, c1968.

Plantations in Leon County, Florida
Cotton plantations in Florida